The 22nd Legislative Assembly of British Columbia sat from 1950 to 1952. The members were elected in the British Columbia general election held in June 1949. The Liberals and Conservatives formed a coalition government led by Byron Ingemar "Boss" Johnson. The Co-operative Commonwealth Federation led by Harold Winch formed the official opposition.

Nancy Hodges served as speaker for the assembly.

Members of the 22nd General Assembly 
The following members were elected to the assembly in 1949:

Notes:

Party standings

By-elections 
By-elections were held to replace members for various reasons:

Notes:

Other changes 
James Mowat joins the Coalition in February 1950.
W.A.C. Bennett resigns from the Coalition to become an Independent on March 15, 1951. He joins the Social Credit League in December but continues to sit as an independent.
Tilly Rolston resigns from the Coalition to become an Independent on March 29, 1951.
The Coalition between the Liberals and Progressive Conservatives collapses on January 19, 1952. Herbert Anscomb, Leslie Harvey Eyres, Roderick Charles MacDonald, Alexander Campbell Hope, Arvid Lundell, Ernest Crawford Carson, Arthur Brown Ritchie, Allan James McDonell, Leigh Forbes Stevenson, Donald Cameron Brown and Albert Reginald MacDougall move to the opposition as Progressive Conservatives.
John Henry Cates, Battleman Milton MacIntyre and Herbert John Welch retain the Coalition designation and continue to support the Johnson Government.
The remaining 23 Coalition MLAs continue to sit as Liberals.

References 

Political history of British Columbia
Terms of British Columbia Parliaments
1950 establishments in British Columbia
1952 disestablishments in British Columbia
20th century in British Columbia